Belvedere is a Canadian punk rock band from Calgary and Edmonton, Canada formed in 1995.

History

Taking their name from the '80s sitcom, Belvedere began in Calgary, in 1995, as the three-piece band of Steve Rawles (guitar/vocals), Brock (bass), and Dan Hrynuik (drums). As the years progressed along with their revolving lineup, Belvedere remained with their melodic pop-punk sound that looked up to the likes of Bad Religion and NOFX. Eventually recruiting second guitarist Scott Marshall, replacement drummer Jay Hollywood, and a replacement bassist Jason Sinclair, the quartet released their debut album, Because No One Stopped Us, in 1998 through Hourglass and 206 Records. After spending most of 1999 on the road - along with Bad Religion and Strung Out, for a stint - Jump Start Records released Belvedere's follow-up album, Angels Live in My Town, in early 2000.

In 2001, Jump Start Records and the Montreal imprint Union 2112 released the album Twas Hell Said Former Child, which coincided with their first-ever European tour. A split release with Downway, Hometown Advantage, was issued in 2003. When it came time to reconvene for another studio album, Belvedere joined producer Blair Calibaba (Sum 41) in Calgary for the recording of Fast Forward Eats the Tape. In the spring of 2004, they shared dates with Death by Stereo, Tsunami Bomb and Misconduct. The band broke up in late 2005, playing their last show to their hometown Calgary crowd in November. Steve and Graham later went on to form This is a Standoff in 2007.

After seven years apart Belvedere, got back together for a 2012 reunion tour. These shows took place in Canada, South America and Europe. The band announced in November 2015 that they were working on recording a new album, however it was confirmed that there was a lineup change, with Casey Lewis replacing Graham Churchill on drums due to Churchill's conflicting commitments. 

On April 30th, 2016, the band released The Revenge of the Fifth, their fifth studio album.

As of late 2019, Jason Sinclair and Scott Marshall were no longer playing members of the band, citing creative differences as their reason for departure. 

In 2021 Belvedere released the album Hindsight Is the Sixth Sense, with Dan Wollach and Ryan Mumby taking over guitar and bass duties, respectively.

Band members

Current members
 Steve Rawles – guitar/vocals (1995-2005 2011-present)
 Casey Lewis – drums (2011-present)
 Dan Wollach – second guitar (2019-present)
 Ryan Mumby – bass (2019-present)

Former members
 Brock  – bass (1995)
 Tim Harley  – bass (1995-1998)
 Dan Hrynuik – drums (1995-1998)
 Scott Marshall – second guitar (1998-2005 2011-2019)
 Jay Hollywood – drums (1998-2003)
 Jason Sinclair – bass (1998-2005 2011-2019)
 Graham Churchill – drums (2003-2005)

Timeline

Discography

Studio albums
 Because No One Stopped Us (1998) Hourglass and 206 Records
 Angels Live in My Town (2000) Jump Start Records
 Twas Hell Said Former Child (2001) Jump Start Records and the Montreal imprint Union 2112
 Fast Forward Eats the Tape (2004)
 The Revenge of the Fifth (2016)
Hindsight Is the Sixth Sense (2021).

Splits and demos
 Hometown Advantage (2003) with Downway
  All of It  (2013)

Music videos
 High School Heroics (1998)
 Closed Doors (2004)
 Slaves to the Pavement (2004)
 Two Minutes for Looking So Good (2004)
 Brandy Wine (2004)
 Elementally Regarded (2004)
 Hairline (2016)

References

External links
 
 

Canadian punk rock groups